Rolf Johannes Ellmer (born 3 December 1960) is a classically trained musician and composer (concert-guitarist) and has become one of Germany's most well known producers in the techno and trance scene.

Together with Markus Löffel (alias Mark Spoon), also from the German music scene, he has recorded under several monikers such as Jam & Spoon, Tokyo Ghetto Pussy and Storm. He was a member of the group Dance 2 Trance, along with Dag Lerner (alias DJ Dag), which had success all over the world and he is considered to be one of the pioneers of trance music.

A string of hits under Jam & Spoon  include "Right in The Night", "Stella", "Kaleidoscope Skies", "How Stella Got Her Groove Back", and "Set Me Free (Empty Rooms)".

Ellmer has also worked as a producer and remixer for other artists such as Deep Forest, Enigma, Moby, and Frankie Goes to Hollywood. Furthermore, he is recognized for being a successful DJ.

References

1960 births
Living people
German DJs
German electronic musicians
Electronic dance music DJs